Salipaludibacillus  is a gram-positive genus of bacteria from the family of Bacillaceae.

References

 

Bacillaceae
Bacteria genera